In physiology, aldosterone escape is a term that has been used to refer to two distinct phenomena involving aldosterone that are exactly opposite each other: 
Escape from the sodium-retaining effects of excess aldosterone (or other mineralocorticoids) in primary hyperaldosteronism, manifested by volume and/or pressure natriuresis.
The inability of ACE inhibitor therapy to reliably suppress aldosterone release, for example, in patients with heart failure or diabetes, usually manifested by increased salt and water retention. This latter sense may rather be termed refractory hyperaldosteronism.

In patients with hyperaldosteronism, chronic exposure to excess aldosterone does not cause edema as might be expected.  Aldosterone initially results in an increase in Na+ reabsorption in these patients through stimulation of ENaC channels in principal cells of the renal collecting tubules. Increased ENaC channels situated in the apical membranes of the principal cells allow for more Na+ reabsorption, which may cause a transient increase in fluid reabsorption as well. However, within a few days, Na+ reabsorption returns to normal as evidenced by normal urinary Na+ levels in these patients.

The proposed mechanism for this phenomenon does not include a reduced sensitivity of mineralocorticoid receptors to aldosterone, because low serum potassium is often seen in these patients, which is the direct result of aldosterone-induced expression of ENaC channels. Furthermore, electrolyte homeostasis is maintained in these patients, which excludes the possibility that other Na+ transporters elsewhere in the kidney are being shut down. If, in fact, other transporters such as the Na+-H+ antiporter in the proximal tubule or the Na+/K+/2Cl− symporter in the thick ascending loop of Henle were being blocked, other electrolyte disturbances would be expected, such as seen during use of diuretics.

Instead, experiments isolating the perfusion pressures seen by glomerular capillaries from heightened systemic pressures due to hyperaldosteronism have shown that Na+ excretion remains minimal until the kidney is exposed to heightened perfusion pressures. These experiments brought about the proposition that initially high perfusion pressures due to increased Na+ and water reabsorption in a hyperaldosterone state actually causes "backflow" of Na+ and water into the tubules.

Normally Na+ and water are reabsorbed from the tubules and dumped into the renal interstitium. From there, Starling forces dictate the gradient for movement of water and Na+ into the peritubular capillaries. Because hydrostatic pressures in the tubules, interstitium and peritubular capillaries are normally equivalent, oncotic pressures govern flow.

Typically, oncotic pressures are higher in the peritubular capillaries, because protein composition in the interstitium is nominal; therefore, Na+ and water leave the interstitial space and enter the capillaries. When hydrostatic pressures are raised in the peritubular capillaries such as seen in hyperaldosteronism, Starling forces begin to favor "backflow" of Na+ and water from the interstitium into the tubules—thus, increasing Na+ excretion. This is the proposed mechanism of "mineralocorticoid escape" for how patients with increased levels of aldosterone are able to maintain Na+ balance and avoid an edematous state.

References

Physiology